Maud Frère (October 10, 1923 – October 17, 1979) was a Belgian writer.

Biography
Maud Frère was born in Brussels, October 10, 1923. She began studying in an arts program, but switched to social studies after both her parents died in 1942. She worked as a social worker and then, in 1945, she married Edmund Frère, an engineer. She later began writing. Besides her novels, she also wrote for the Office de Radiodiffusion Télévision Française, as well as for various Belgian media. Frère also published a series of children's books featuring the character Véronique.

Frère's most noted work was produced between 1956 and 1972 and was published by the French publishing house Éditions Gallimard. Her novels mainly deal with the challenges in the lives of women in post-war Belgium. The plots of these novels do not move toward a definite conclusion; although the protagonist will take a new direction in her life, that direction has not yet been determined.

Later in life, she suffered from painful migraines which she treated with powerful analgesics. Frère died from a fall, October 17, 1979, at the age of 56.

Awards

Selected works 
 Vacances secrètes (1956)
 L'herbe à moi (1957)
 La grenouille (1959), received the Prix Charles Veillon
 La délice (1961), was made into a 1974 film 
 Les jumeaux millénaires (1962), received the Prix Victor-Rossel
 Guido (1965)
 Le temps d'une carte postale (1967)
 L'ange aveugle (1970)
 Des nuits aventureuses (1972)

References 

1923 births
1979 deaths
Belgian women novelists
Belgian children's writers
Belgian women children's writers
Belgian writers in French
Writers from Brussels
20th-century Belgian novelists
20th-century Belgian women writers